Henri Crick (born 22 July 1932) is a Belgian basketball player. He competed in the men's tournament at the 1952 Summer Olympics.

References

1932 births
Living people
Belgian men's basketball players
Olympic basketball players of Belgium
Basketball players at the 1952 Summer Olympics
Place of birth missing (living people)